College Prep International located in Montreal is an English-language elementary and secondary level private school. The school was established in 1944 by Abraham Brodsky and Phillip Finkel as Prep School of Montreal and in 1993 changed its name to College Prep International.

College Prep International offers education from elementary 5 through secondary 5.

History
In 1944, Abraham Brodsky organized classes for Graduates of Sir George Williams University where he was a teacher. By 1947 Phillip Finkel joined his fellow Graduate A. Brodsky and started their own tutorial school at 4240 Girouard Ave. and the name Prep School of Montreal was established. From 1947 they taught elementary and high school subjects to students from grade 1 through grade 11. During evenings  Prep School offered adult education.

College Prep was known for helping students through small classes and good discipline, to achieve their high school diplomas. In 1977 Ursulene T. Mora joined Prep School and started changing its profile to high academics. The name College Prep International was registered in 1993 and the school moved to its present home at 7475 Sherbrooke West.

Ashton Livingston joined Prep School in 1950. Steve Lawrence was an academic advisor from 1960. Bhagwan Sadaranganey was an academic advisor from 1970. Donna Vaicekauskas was an academic advisor from 1990.  Cheryl Selby was a teacher from 1974 to 1978.

References 

 College Prep International "College Prep International"
 Education, Loisir et Sport Quebec (Ministry of Education:P.111) "Commission consultative de l'enseignement prive"

External links 
 College Prep International
 Our Kids

High schools in Canada
English-language schools in Quebec
Elementary schools in Montreal
High schools in Montreal
Private schools in Quebec
Preparatory schools in Quebec
Educational institutions established in 1944
1944 establishments in Quebec